KVAL-TV (channel 13) is a television station in Eugene, Oregon, United States, affiliated with CBS. It is owned by Sinclair Broadcast Group, which provides certain services to dual NBC/CW+ affiliate KMTR (channel 16) under a shared services agreement (SSA) with Roberts Media, LLC. Both stations share studios on Blanton Road in Eugene, where KVAL's transmitter is also located. KMTR maintained separate facilities on International Court in Springfield, Oregon, until 2020 when the station relocated to KVAL's building; master control and some internal operations for KMTR were based at the KVAL studios.

KVAL-TV reaches additional viewers in west-central Oregon via co-owned full-power semi-satellites KCBY-TV (channel 11) in Coos Bay and KPIC (channel 4) in Roseburg.

History
The station began broadcasting on April 15, 1954, locally owned by Eugene Television. Originally, it carried programming from all three networks, but was primarily an NBC affiliate. It lost CBS and ABC when KEZI signed on in 1960. Eugene Television bought KBCI-TV (now KBOI-TV) in Boise, Idaho in 1975 and changed its name to Northwest Television.

In the summer of 1978, as NBC was floundering in third place in the Nielsen ratings, KVAL started airing five hours of CBS programming each week. During the next four years, the station gradually offered more programs from CBS. NBC affiliated with newly signed-on KMTR in 1982, and KVAL formally switched its affiliation to CBS.

Retlaw Enterprises (a company owned by relatives of Walt Disney, Retlaw being "Walter" backwards) bought the station in 1996. Fisher Communications bought Retlaw's entire broadcasting division, including KVAL, in 1998.

Many KVAL alumni have gone on to be elected into office. , schools superintendent Susan Castillo is a former KVAL reporter. Former Secretary of State Bill Bradbury, who left office in January 2009, is also a former reporter and on-air personality. Bradbury and Castillo also served in the Oregon Legislature, as did KVAL alumni Wayne Whitehead and Mark Hass.

In September 2000, KVAL debuted an original sports program, Inside the Pac, a reference to the Pac-12 Conference which includes the University of Oregon and Oregon State University, both in KVAL's coverage area. Inside the Pac was created after the Oregon Sports Network TV contract went to local rival KEZI, along with the seasonal weekly program featuring Oregon Ducks football head coach Mike Bellotti. Airing each Sunday afternoon, Inside the Pac features game highlights and talk about Pac-12 sports. It was originally hosted by former KVAL sports director and longtime Eugene TV broadcaster Todd McKim, who left KVAL in 2005. Also featured on the show as in-studio guests are former college football players from Oregon and Oregon State, who share their knowledge and experience.

On April 11, 2013, Fisher announced that it would sell its properties, including KVAL, KCBY, and KPIC, to the Sinclair Broadcast Group. The deal was completed on August 8, 2013.

Programming
KVAL, KCBY and KPIC air nearly all CBS programs, but preempt occasional programs and the CBS Thanksgiving Day Parade for a regular episode of CBS-distributed Dr. Phil, as well as infomercials. In the late 1990s and early 2000s, it preempted The Bold and the Beautiful to air syndicated talk shows in the 11 a.m. hour, which is usually the slot for The Young and the Restless on the West Coast, while Y&R was moved to 12 noon, followed by As the World Turns and Guiding Light, the usual slots for the latter two soaps.

News operation

In December 2005, KVAL launched a newscast called Northwest News at 10 on Fox for local Fox affiliate KLSR-TV (channel 34). Katie Dyer anchored the newscast until April 2007, when Natasha Chugthai took over. This newscast came into its own in April 2007, with a new graphics scheme similar to that of such Fox affiliates as WNYW in New York and KTTV in Los Angeles. In August 2007, the newscast got its own theme music, rather than continuing to share the opening tune with KVAL. In March 2008, Northwest News at 10 was renamed Fox News @ 10 for the live weekday broadcast, and KVAL News @ 10 on Fox for the weekend repeats of the evening news. KVAL's 6 a.m. hour of morning news is replayed on KLSR at 7 a.m.

In September 2007, KVAL's morning news started airing from 5 to 7 a.m., beating rival KMTR, whose morning newscasts start at 5:30 a.m. KEZI soon announced it would begin to broadcast from 5 to 7 a.m. as well, branding the early-morning newscast with a new look and a new team.

In October 2008, Al Peterson, former KEZI morning news anchor, joined KVAL's morning news team. He replaced Seth Wayne, who moved to a station in Tucson, Arizona. The day Peterson took over, KVAL, like most other Fisher stations, adopted a new graphics scheme heavily emphasizing the station's CBS affiliation. KVAL also rebranded its news as KVAL News, dropping the 50-year-old Northwest News. The station also adopted a new news slogan: "First, Fair, Accurate." On May 10, 2010, KVAL News debuted a new set and started broadcasting newscasts in 16:9 widescreen.

In spring 2012, KVAL took complete control over the news departments at semi-satellites KCBY and KPIC. Previously, the content in those newsrooms was controlled by a news director who oversaw two to three reporters. Today, the KVAL news director oversees KCBY and KPIC's content. During the third block during the 5 and 6 p.m. news and second block during the 11 p.m. news, KCBY and KPIC air pre-recorded four-minute local news blocks that include a local weather forecast. In the mornings, KPIC and KCBY have five minutes of local news at 6:55 a.m., and produce their own local cut-ins during CBS Mornings. Roseburg and Coos Bay content is also interwoven into KVAL and KLSR's news. If there is a large breaking-news event or a special project happening in Roseburg and/or Coos Bay, Eugene viewers will see the KPIC and/or KCBY reporters, respectively. On a normal day, they do not because the signals are not switched for viewers in Eugene, or on DirecTV and Dish Network. Usually while the semi-satellites are running the local segment, a long block of weather is aired in Eugene and on satellite.

On February 26, 2020, KVAL debuted a new set, and became the second station in Eugene to broadcast news in HD.

Digital channels
The stations' digital signals are multiplexed:

Analog-to-digital conversion
KVAL-TV shut down its analog signal, over VHF channel 13, on June 12, 2009, the official date on which full-power television stations in the United States transitioned from analog to digital broadcasts under federal mandate. The station's digital signal relocated from its pre-transition UHF channel 25 to VHF channel 13.
The stations' analog signals went off-air at 12:37 a.m. PDT on June 12.

Rebroadcasters

Semi-satellites

Notes:
1. KPIC is licensed to South West Oregon TV Broadcasting Corporation, which is half-owned by Sinclair and half-owned by California Oregon Broadcasting.
2. Both KCBY-TV and KPIC maintain separate studio facilities/newsrooms, and air local commercials targeting the Coos Bay and Roseburg areas.

Translators

Low-power translators in Elkton, Glendale, Mapleton, Myrtle Point, Newport, Oakland, Oakridge, and Swisshome have been discontinued.

References

External links

KVAL website
KCBY website
KPIC website

CBS network affiliates
Charge! (TV network) affiliates
TBD (TV network) affiliates
Sinclair Broadcast Group
Television channels and stations established in 1954
VAL-TV
1954 establishments in Oregon